Benito Joanet Giménez (16 September 1935 – 22 March 2020) was a Spanish football player and manager.

Playing career
Born in Esplugues de Llobregat, Joanet played as a goalkeeper for Espanyol, Real Zaragoza, Terrassa, Europa and Deportivo de La Coruña.

Coaching career
After retiring he became a football manager, taking charge of Hércules, Castellón, Antequerano, Cádiz, Mallorca, Tenerife, Espanyol, Salamanca and Las Palmas.

Death
Joanet died in Alicante on 22 March 2020 from COVID-19, during the COVID-19 pandemic.

References

1935 births
2020 deaths
People from Esplugues de Llobregat
Sportspeople from the Province of Barcelona
Spanish footballers
RCD Espanyol footballers
Real Zaragoza players
Terrassa FC footballers
CE Europa footballers
Deportivo de La Coruña players
Segunda División players
La Liga players
Association football goalkeepers
Spanish football managers
Hércules CF managers
CD Castellón managers
CD Antequerano managers
Cádiz CF managers
RCD Mallorca managers
CD Tenerife managers
RCD Espanyol managers
UD Salamanca managers
UD Las Palmas managers
Deaths from the COVID-19 pandemic in Spain
Footballers from Catalonia